Morinda officinalis, also known as Indian mulberry, is a plant in the genus Morinda.

Medicinal uses
The root of M. officinalis is used in traditional Chinese medicine (TCM). It was first described in Shen Nong Ben Cao Jing. In TCM it is indicated in the case of kidney yang deficiency and associated impotence, weak tendons and bones, presence of wind and dampness.

Known compounds include morindin.

Various nominal

It is known as ba kich in Vietnamese.

References

officinalis
Plants described in 1958
Plants used in traditional Chinese medicine